Yekdar (also, Ektor Kishlag) is a small village in the Quba Rayon of Azerbaijan. The village forms part of the municipality of Rustov and has a population of 9.

References

External links

Populated places in Quba District (Azerbaijan)